Lady Violet Georgiana Powell (née Pakenham; 13 March 1912 – 12 January 2002) was a British writer and critic. Her husband was the author Anthony Powell.

Life and career
Lady Violet was the third daughter of Thomas Pakenham, 5th Earl of Longford, and the former Lady Mary Child-Villiers, daughter of Victor Child-Villiers, 7th Earl of Jersey. She was educated at St Margaret's School, Bushey.

Lady Violet was a member of a literary family; her brothers were Edward Pakenham and Frank Pakenham, while her sisters included the novelist and biographer Lady Pansy Lamb and the historian Lady Mary Clive. She was herself a distinguished memoirist and biographer. Her The Life of a Provincial Lady (1988), on the life of E. M. Delafield, has been called by the scholar Nicholas Birns "one of the best literary biographies of a British writer in the twentieth century". Those who knew the couple well believed that Lady Violet made significant contributions to the richness, depth and polish of her husband's work. She also wrote a biography of the English novelist Flora Annie Steel.

Influence
She is generally taken to be the model for the character of Isobel Tolland in her husband's novel sequence A Dance to the Music of Time.

Books
Some of her books are:

 The Album of Anthony Powell's Dance to the Music of Time
 A Compton-Burnett Compendium
 A Jane Austen Compendium: The Six Major Novels
 The Constant Novelist: A Study of Margaret Kennedy, 1896–1967
 Flora Annie Steel: Novelist of India
 The Irish Cousins: The Books and Background of Somerville and Ross
 The Life of a Provincial Lady: A Study of E.M. Delafield and Her Works
 Margaret, Countess of Jersey: A Biography
 A Substantial Ghost: The Literary Adventures of Maude ffoulkes

Autobiography
 Five Out of Six: An Autobiography (a reference to her birth order amongst her siblings)
 Within the Family Circle: An Autobiography
 The Departure Platform: An Autobiography
 A Stone in the Shade: Last Memoirs

Personal life
She married Anthony Powell (21 December 1905 – 28 March 2000) on 1 December 1934 at All Saints Anglican Church, Ennismore Gardens, Knightsbridge; they had two children, Tristram and John.

References

1912 births
2002 deaths
English biographers
Daughters of Irish earls
People educated at St Margaret's School, Bushey
Violet
English women writers
Women autobiographers
English autobiographers